Zahra Kamalfar is an Iranian refugee living in Canada.  She was originally from the Muslim Dervish sect and her husband was executed in Iranian custody.  After her husband's death, she fled the country with her son Davood and daughter Anna.  From Turkey, they fled  into Russia. From Russia, the family planned to go to Germany and then seek political asylum in Canada.  When Kamalfar went to Germany, the German authorities sent her back to Russia. Russia planned to deport her back to Iran but they did not. Instead, she lived in the Sheremetyevo International Airport for ten months, and finally went to Canada where she has been residing since March 15, 2007.

Plea Message from Zahra Kamalfar from Sheremetivo airport
On Saturday November 18, 2006, Zahra Kamalfar passed the following video message from Sheremetivo airport:
We have nowhere to sleep, nowhere to rest and nowhere to bathe.
My kids have not seen the sun for 16 month, no sunlight. They haven't seen daylight or nighttime.
Life in here is very hard. My kids have nowhere to take a shower to clean themselves.
There water here is from the toilet, we drink from the toilet water.
In the toilet we fill the bucket of the water in the middle of the night away from the eyes of the authority to take the bath.
I have no place to wash my clothes, all doors are close on us.
In here they disrespect us, police have attack us they throw our belongings in the middle of the transit hall, she push me, I hit the wall and blood drip out from my mouth. She told me you have too much staff, don't sit here sit there. Every night she questioning us: Who you are? Where are you going too? There is not humanity here, no human rights, nobody care about us, nobody hears our scream, and all doors are close to us.
We sleep on a cold floor. 
My son is 12 years of age his teeth are falling off. He pull three teeth with his own hands without a medicine.
I beg to come to our help and save us from this hell.
My daughter is ill there are brown spots all over here body, her teeth are falling out she needs to see the dentist.
Please help us.

References

See also
Stateless person, people who are in legal immigration limbo and not technically allowed into any country.
Mehran Karimi Nasseri
Feng Zhenghu
Hiroshi Nohara
Sanjay Shah
List of people who have lived at airports

Year of birth missing (living people)
Living people
Iranian refugees
Iranian emigrants to Canada